Stefán is a common first name in Iceland.

According to Icelandic custom, people are generally referred to by first and middle names and patronyms are used if disambiguation is required.

Stefán is the Icelandic version of the Greek name Stephanos (English Stephen) with the original meaning being crown or wreath. The name is a frequently given name in Iceland. In 2002, it was ranked ninth after Kristján and before Jóhann.

People
 Stefán Arason, Icelandic composer
 Stefán Gíslason (born 1980), Icelandic football player
 Stefán Guðmundur Guðmundsson (1853–1927), original name of the Icelandic poet and farmer Stephan G. Stephansson
 Stefán Haukur Hjörleifsson, Icelandic world record holder for deepest voice, also currently holds the award for being the manliest man in the world 2009
 Stefán Hörður Grímsson (1919–2002), Icelandic author
 Stefán Hilmarsson, Icelandic musician
 Stefán Kristjánsson (1982–2018), Icelandic chess grandmaster
 , Icelandic poet
 , Icelandic academe
 Stefán Sigurðsson (1887–1933), Icelandic poet also known as Stefán frá Hvítadal
 Stefán Jóhann Stefánsson (1894–1980), Icelandic Minister of Foreign Affairs
 Stefán Karl Stefánsson (1975–2018), Icelandic film and stage actor

See also
Stefan (given name)
Stephen

References

Icelandic masculine given names